Josep Antoni Coderch i de Sentmenat (Barcelona, 26 November 1913 in - Barcelona, 6 November 1984), Spanish architect recognized as one of the most important post-World War II architects.

Early life and career
In 1932 Coderch started studying architecture at the Barcelona School of Architecture, which he graduated in 1940. He started his office with Manual Valls in 1942. After graduating he worked in Madrid with Pedro Muguruza and Secundino Zuazo. Years later, he is appointed city architect of Sitges, where he designs the Civil Guard garrison.
After joining the CIAM, he became a member of Team 10 in 1960.

Buildings

 1951 Ugalde House, Barcelona
 1951 Casa de la Marina, Barcelona
 1952 Spanish pavilion of the Triennale in Milan, Italy
 1957 Ballvè House, Camprodón, Girona
 1957 Olano House, Comillas, Cantabria
 1961 Biosca House, Igualada, Barcelona
 1962 Hotel del Mar, Palma, Majorca
 1964 Luque House, Sant Cugat del Vallès, Barcelona
 1965 Gili House, Sitges
 1966 Entrecanales House, La Moraleja, Madrid
 1967 Rovira House, Canet de Mar, Barcelona
 1969-71 Soler-Badia House, Igualada, Barcelona
 1970-72 Zóbel House, Sotogrande, Cádiz
 1971 Güell House, Barcelona

References

External links

Coderch archives

1913 births
1984 deaths
20th-century Catalan architects